Albion Township is a township in Howard County, Iowa, United States.

References

Howard County, Iowa
Townships in Iowa